Buffalo Junction is an unincorporated community in Mecklenburg County, Virginia, United States. Buffalo Junction has a post office with ZIP code 24529. Buffalo Junction  is home to Buffalo Baptist Church a beautiful Southern Baptist Church nestled at the bottom of Buffalo Church Rd, just south of highway 58. Buffalo Baptist Church is an interesting part of the community's history having been founded in 1778, just after the nation's independence.

The name of the location is derived from its history as a railroad junction. The Atlantic and Danville Railway used to pass through the community and a wye was located there that connected the mainline to Buffalo Springs, 3.89 miles away, via the Buffalo Springs Branch. The branch opened prior to 1890 and was closed by 1940.

References

Unincorporated communities in Mecklenburg County, Virginia
Unincorporated communities in Virginia